Robert Pernell Wade (born December 9, 1944) is a former men's college basketball head coach for the University of Maryland (1986–1989), as well as an American football defensive back for the National Football League (NFL).

He spent from 1996 to 2015 as athletics coordinator of the Baltimore City Public School System.

Football career
Wade played college football at Morgan State University.  After his collegiate career, he played in the NFL as a defensive back for the Pittsburgh Steelers (1968), the Washington Redskins (1969), and the Denver Broncos (1970). He was released by the Redskins during training camp on September 1, 1970.

Basketball coaching career
Prior to his coaching stint at Maryland, Wade coached at Baltimore's Dunbar High School for ten years, where he compiled a 341–25 record and was often ranked in the nation's top 10.  In his best two seasons at the inner-city high school, 1981–1983, Wade put together teams that produced a 60–0 record, the second of which was ranked first in the nation by USAToday.  His 1981–82 team produced four future NBA players – three of them first-round draft picks – including Boston Celtics captain Reggie Lewis, who was the high school's team's sixth man, and 5'-3" Tyrone "Muggsy" Bogues, who had a 14-year NBA career despite being the shortest player in league history.  The other two future NBA players were David Wingate and Reggie Williams, who also combined to win an NCAA championship at Georgetown in 1984.

Wade was originally hired to replace Lefty Driesell, Maryland's basketball coach of 17 years.  Driesell resigned over concerns about the death of All-American forward Len Bias and subsequent revelations about his players' academic performances. Wade and Driesell had a frosty relationship, and Wade had consistently said he hadn't wanted Dunbar prospects to play for Driesell at Maryland—facts not overlooked by commentators. Wade was known as a strong disciplinarian, and he was appealing to Maryland administrators who were attempting to clean up the basketball program.  He was also hired in order to increase diversity, as he became the first African American coach of a major sport in the Atlantic Coast Conference, despite the fact that he had no prior experience in coaching a team at the collegiate level.

Largely due to the loss of several players suspended after the Len Bias incident, Wade's first season was one of the worst in school history.  The Terps suffered their only winless record in ACC play, as part of an overall 9–17 record.  Wade quickly rebuilt the team and got the Terps back into the NCAA tournament a year later. Due to the transfer of star players Brian Williams and Steve Hood, the team significantly regressed in 1988–89, losing 20 games, the most in school history.  Wade was forced to resign on May 12, 1989 after only three years as head coach, compiling a 36–50 record, including only seven wins in ACC play. His resignation came amid allegations that he broke NCAA rules in dealing with players and recruits. While criticized for his coaching abilities, his ability to recruit was not in question. In only two years of recruiting (he was hired too late for any serious recruiting his first year), Wade landed three NBA first round draft picks in Brian Carson Williams (who later changed his name to Bison Dele), Jerrod Mustaf, and Walt Williams.

An investigation found that, among other things, Wade had provided a loan to one of his recruits and provided free clothes to his players.  More seriously, Wade lied to the NCAA on several occasions, and even went as far as to hold a meeting with his staff to coordinate plans to lie to the NCAA.  In one of the toughest penalties handed out by the NCAA for such transgressions, the Terps were placed on three years' probation, banned from postseason play in 1991 and 1992 and kicked off live television for the 1990–91 season.  Their 1988 NCAA Tournament appearance was also scrubbed from the books due to ineligible players. Wade himself was hit with a five-year show-cause order, which effectively blackballed him from the collegiate ranks until 1995.

Coaching record

* 1988 NCAA Tournament appearance was vacated due to ineligible players; official record is 17–12.
^ Record at Maryland is 35–49 (7–35 ACC) without vacated games.

References

1944 births
Living people
African-American basketball coaches
African-American players of American football
American football defensive backs
Basketball coaches from Maryland
College men's basketball head coaches in the United States
Denver Broncos players
High school basketball coaches in the United States
Maryland Terrapins men's basketball coaches
Morgan State Bears football players
NCAA sanctions
Pittsburgh Steelers players
Players of American football from Baltimore
Washington Redskins players
21st-century African-American people
20th-century African-American sportspeople